The 1991 Tulip European Open was a professional ranking snooker tournament that took place in March 1991 at the Imax Centre in Rotterdam, Netherlands.

Tony Jones won the tournament, defeating Mark Johnston-Allen 9–7 in the final.


Main draw

References

European Masters (snooker)
1991 in snooker
European Open (snooker)
European Open (snooker)
Snooker in the Netherlands
Sports competitions in Rotterdam
20th century in Rotterdam